South Buckinghamshire was a parliamentary constituency in the county of Buckinghamshire, England.  From 1950 to 1974, it returned one Member of Parliament (MP) to the House of Commons of the Parliament of the United Kingdom, elected by the first-past-the-post voting system.

History 

The constituency was created for the 1950 general election as part of the First Periodic Review of Westminster Constituencies of seats by a permanent Boundary Commission for England which had been established by the House of Commons (Redistribution of Seats) Act 1944.

The constituency comprised the Urban District of Beaconsfield and parts of the Rural District of Amersham, transferred from the Aylesbury constituency, and the Rural District of Eton, transferred from Eton & Slough.

The constituency was abolished for the February 1974 general election, when major boundary changes split the area between the new constituencies of Beaconsfield and Chesham & Amersham.  The parts of the Rural District of Amersham were included in Chesham and Amersham.  Beaconsfield and the Rural District of Eton formed the bulk of the Beaconsfield constituency.

Boundaries
The Urban District of Beaconsfield, the Rural District of Eton, and in the Rural District of Amersham the parishes of Amersham, Chalfont St Giles, Chalfont St Peter, Chenies, Chesham Bois, Coleshill, Penn, and Seer Green.

South Buckinghamshire was a county constituency and a division of the administrative county of Buckinghamshire. It comprised part of southern Buckinghamshire, bordering Aylesbury to the north, Wycombe to the west and Eton and Slough to the south.

Members of Parliament

Elections

Elections in the 1950s

Elections in the 1960s

Elections in the 1970s

References

Sources
 Boundaries of Parliamentary Constituencies 1885-1972, compiled and edited by F. W. S. Craig (Political Reference Publications, 1972)
 British Parliamentary Election Results 1950-1973, compiled and edited  by F.W.S. Craig (Parliamentary Research Services 1983).

Parliamentary constituencies in Buckinghamshire (historic)
Constituencies of the Parliament of the United Kingdom established in 1950
Constituencies of the Parliament of the United Kingdom disestablished in 1974